"Oui oh oui" is a song by the Belgian Eurodance singer Kim Kay. It was released in 1998 on EMI as the second single and as well as the sixth track from her debut studio album, La Vie en lilali (1998). It is a Eurodance song that was written by Wim Claes, Katrien Gillis, and Guido Veulemans and produced by Phil Sterman and Lov Cook.

Track listing

Charts

References

External links
 
 
 

1998 singles
1998 songs
Kim Kay songs
EMI Records singles
French-language songs